Alwin H. Küchler (born 1965) is a German cinematographer.

Career
Born 1965 in Düsseldorf, Alwin H. Küchler started his career as assistant to a fashion photographer.

When he supported his friend Jakob Claussen, who later became a film producer, during the production of a study film, Küchler became interested in cinematography.

From 1990 to 1994 Küchler studied cinematography at the National Film and Television School. During his study he met Lynne Ramsay and realized a few short films with her. In 1999 he made his feature film debut with Ramseys Ratcatcher.

Küchler was nominated for a European Film Award for Best Cinematographer for his works on Morvern Callar in 2002 and Code 46 in 2004.

In 2015, Küchler worked with Danny Boyle on the film Steve Jobs.

Personal life
Küchler is married to director Ngozi Onwurah, and they have one daughter together.

Filmography

References

External links
 
 

1965 births
German cinematographers
Living people
Film people from Düsseldorf
Alumni of the National Film and Television School